This is a list of television broadcasters which provide coverage of the Eredivisie, Dutch football's top-level competition.

Netherlands 
All matches live on ESPN through 2024–25, with highlights available on NOS.

Outside the Netherlands

Americas

Asia

Europe

MENA

Oceania

Sub-Saharan Africa

References

Association football on television
Eredivisie